Jarle Simensen (born 23 March 1937, in Os, Hedmark) is a Norwegian historian.

He took the cand.philol. degree at the University of Oslo in 1966, and worked as a research assistant at the same university, a research fellow at the Norwegian Research Council and Institute of Social Research and, briefly, associate professor (førsteamanuensis) at the University of Trondheim before taking the dr.philos. degree in Trondheim in 1976. He was then a professor there from 1980 to 2004. He returned to the University of Oslo in 1996 to hold the position of adjunct professor (professor II); he is currently professor emeritus there.

He is a member of the Norwegian Academy of Science and Letters.

Selected bibliography
Commoners, Chiefs and Colonial Government. Akim Abuakwa, Ghana, under British Rule, 1975
Afrikas historie. Nye perspektiver, 1983
Norsk misjon i afrikansk historie. Sør-Afrika, 1984
Norwegian Missions in African History. Vol. 1. South Africa 1845-1906, 1986; Vol.2: Madagascar, 1986
Utdanning som u-hjelp. NORAD og fiskeriopplæringen ved Ghana Nautical College, 1964-1980, 1990 
Vesten erobrer verden, 1870-1914, volume 12 in Aschehougs Verdenshistorie, 1986
Tyskland-Norge. Den lange historien, (ed.), 2000

References

University of Oslo
List of publications in FRIDA
Jarle Simensen private archive is kept at NTNU University Library

1937 births
Living people
20th-century Norwegian historians
University of Oslo alumni
Norwegian University of Science and Technology alumni
Academic staff of the Norwegian University of Science and Technology
Academic staff of the University of Oslo
Members of the Norwegian Academy of Science and Letters